Blue zebra cichlid is a common name for several fish and may refer to:

Maylandia callainos
Maylandia greshakei
Metriaclima callainos